This is a list of records and statistics of the men's Olympic water polo tournament since the inaugural official edition in 1900.

Abbreviations

General statistics
This is a summary of men's water polo at the Summer Olympics by tournament.

The following table shows winning teams, coaches and captains by tournament. Last updated: 8 August 2021.

Legend
  – Olympic winning streak (winning three or more Olympic titles in a row)
  – Winning all matches during the tournament
  – Host team
 Team† – Defunct team

The following table shows top goalscorers, goalkeepers, sprinters and Most Valuable Players by tournament. Last updated: 8 August 2021.

Notes:
 Top goalscorer: the water polo player who scored the most goals in a tournament.
 Top goalkeeper: the water polo player who saved the most shots in a tournament.
 Top sprinter: the water polo player who won the most sprints in a tournament.
 Most Valuable Player: the water polo player who was named the Most Valuable Player of a tournament.

Legend and abbreviation
  – Olympic winning streak
  – Winning all matches during the tournament
  – Host team
 Team† – Defunct team
 Player‡ – Player who won the tournament with his team
 Eff % – Save efficiency (Saves / Shots)

Confederation statistics

Best performances by tournament
This is a summary of the best performances of each confederation in each tournament. Last updated: 8 August 2021.

Note: italic number in header means unofficial tournament was held.

Legend
  – Champions
  – Runners-up
  – Third place
  – Fourth place
  – Qualified for forthcoming tournament

All-time best performances
This is a summary of the best performances of each confederation at the Olympics. Last updated: 8 August 2021.

Legend
 Year* – As host team
 Team† – Defunct team

Team statistics

Comprehensive team results by tournament
Note: Results of Olympic qualification tournaments are not included. Numbers refer to the final placing of each team at the respective Games; italic number in header means unofficial tournament was held. Last updated: 8 August 2021.

Legend

  – Champions
  – Runners-up
  – Third place
  – Fourth place
  – Qualified but were not allowed to compete
  – Disqualified
  – The nation did not participate in the Games
  – Qualified for forthcoming tournament
  – Hosts
 = – More than one team tied for that rank
 Team† – Defunct team

Abbreviation

 stats – Olympic water polo team statistics
 EUA – United Team of Germany
 FRG – West Germany
 FRY – FR Yugoslavia
 GDR – East Germany
 SCG – Serbia and Montenegro

Number of appearances by team
The following table is pre-sorted by number of appearances (in descending order), year of the last appearance (in ascending order), year of the first appearance (in ascending order), name of the team (in ascending order), respectively. Last updated: 8 August 2021.

Legend and abbreviation
 Year* – As host team
 Team† – Defunct team
 Apps – Appearances
 stats – Olympic water polo team statistics

Best finishes by team
The following table is pre-sorted by best finish (in descending order), name of the team (in ascending order), respectively. Last updated: 8 August 2021.

Legend and abbreviation
 Year* – As host team
 Team† – Defunct team
 Apps – Appearances
 stats – Olympic water polo team statistics

Finishes in the top four
The following table is pre-sorted by total finishes in the top four (in descending order), number of Olympic gold medals (in descending order), number of Olympic silver medals (in descending order), number of Olympic bronze medals (in descending order), name of the team (in ascending order), respectively. Last updated: 8 August 2021.

Legend
 Year* – As host team
 Team† – Defunct team

Medal table
The following table is pre-sorted by number of Olympic gold medals (in descending order), number of Olympic silver medals (in descending order), number of Olympic bronze medals (in descending order), name of the team (in ascending order), respectively. Last updated: 31 December 2021.

Hungary is the most successful country in the men's Olympic water polo tournament, with nine gold, three silver and four bronze.

Legend
 Team† – Defunct team

Champions (results)

Champions (squads)

Olympic and world champions (teams)

Team records

Player statistics

Age records
The following tables show the oldest and youngest players who competed in men's water polo at the Summer Olympics, and the oldest and youngest male Olympic medalists in water polo. Last updated: 1 April 2021.
Legend
  – Host team
 Player‡ – Player who won the tournament with his team
Appearance

Medalist

Multiple appearances (five-time Olympians)

The following table is pre-sorted by number of Olympic appearances (in descending order), year of the last Olympic appearance (in ascending order), year of the first Olympic appearance (in ascending order), date of birth (in ascending order), name of the player (in ascending order), respectively. Last updated: 26 July 2021.

Seventeen athletes competed in water polo at five or more Olympic Games between 1900 and 2020 inclusive. Paul Radmilovic, representing Great Britain, is the first water polo player to compete at five Olympics (1908–1928).

Four players (Manuel Estiarte, Salvador Gómez, Jesús Rollán and Jordi Sans) were all members of the Spain men's national water polo team (1988–2000). Manuel Estiarte is the first and only water polo player (man or woman) to compete at six Olympics (1980–2000). Jesús Rollán is the first water polo goalkeeper of either gender to compete at five Olympics (1984–2004).

Tony Azevedo of the United States is the first non-European water polo player to compete at five Olympic Games (2000–2016).

Italian goalkeeper Stefano Tempesti competed at five Olympics between 2000 and 2016.

Legend and abbreviation
  – Hosts
 Apps – Appearances

Multiple medalists

The following table is pre-sorted by total number of Olympic medals (in descending order), number of Olympic gold medals (in descending order), number of Olympic silver medals (in descending order), year of receiving the last Olympic medal (in ascending order), year of receiving the first Olympic medal (in ascending order), name of the player (in ascending order), respectively. Last updated: 11 August 2021.

Eleven male athletes won four or more Olympic medals in water polo. Among them, seven were members of the Hungary men's national water polo team. Dezső Gyarmati is the first and only athlete (man or woman) to win five Olympic medals in water polo (three gold, one silver and one bronze).

Filip Filipović, Duško Pijetlović and Andrija Prlainović, all representing Serbia, won four consecutive Olympic medals between 2008 and 2021.

Legend
  – Hosts

Sources:
 Sports Reference: Athlete Medal Leaders (1900–2016);
 Official Results Books (PDF): 2000 (p. 27), 2004 (p. 89), 2008 (p. 79), 2012 (p. 370), 2016 (p. 6), 2020 (p. 11).

Multiple gold medalists

The following table is pre-sorted by number of Olympic gold medals (in descending order), number of Olympic silver medals (in descending order), number of Olympic bronze medals (in descending order), year of receiving the last Olympic gold medal (in ascending order), year of receiving the first Olympic gold medal (in ascending order), name of the player (in ascending order), respectively. Last updated: 31 March 2021.

Ten athletes won three or more Olympic gold medals in water polo. Six players (Tibor Benedek, Péter Biros, Tamás Kásás, Gergely Kiss, Tamás Molnár and Zoltán Szécsi) were all members of the Hungary men's national water polo team that won three consecutive Olympic gold medals in 2000, 2004 and 2008.

There are thirty-one male athletes who won two Olympic gold medals in water polo.

Legend
  – Hosts

Top goalscorers (one match)

The following table is pre-sorted by date of the match (in ascending order), name of the player (in ascending order), respectively. Last updated: 4 August 2021.

Scoring seven or more goals in a water polo match is a great feat, as it has only been accomplished 12 times, by 12 players, in the history of men's Olympic tournament.

The first two Olympians to do so were Olivér Halassy and János Németh, with Hungary men's national team in Los Angeles on 8 August 1932. Halassy lost his left leg below the knee when he was a boy. He is the first and only amputee athlete to compete in water polo at the Summer Olympics.

The most recent player to do so was Krisztián Manhercz, with Hungary men's national team in Tokyo on 4 August 2021.

Four players have each netted nine goals in an Olympic match. Hungarian center forward János Németh is the first water polo player to achieve this feat. On 22 October 1968, Zoran Janković of Yugoslavia became the second player to do so. And Manuel Estiarte of Spain is the third player. At the 2008 Games, Aleksandar Šapić of Serbia became the first player to score nine goals in an Olympic match in the 21st century.

At the 1968 Summer Olympics, László Felkai netted seven goals in the bronze medal match on 26 October 1968, helping the Hungarian team win the match. A few hours later, Yugoslavia won the gold medal match over the Soviet Union after extra time, 13–11, despite seven goals scored by Aleksei Barkalov.

Legend and abbreviation

  – Player's team drew the match
  – Player's team lost the match
  – Host team
 Player‡ – Player who won the tournament with his team
 G – Goals
 aet – After extra time
 pso – Penalty shootout

The following table shows the historical progression of the record of goals scored by a male water polo player in a single Olympic match. Last updated: 1 April 2021.

Legend
  – Host team
 Player‡ – Player who won the tournament with his team

Top goalscorers (one tournament)

The following table is pre-sorted by number of goals (in descending order), edition of the Olympics (in ascending order), number of matches played (in ascending order), name of the player (in ascending order), respectively. Last updated: 1 April 2021.

Five male players have scored 25 or more goals in an Olympic water polo tournament.

Spaniard Manuel Estiarte is the first and only water polo player to achieve this feat twice. At the 1984 Summer Olympics, Estiarte netted 34 goals, setting the record for the most goals scored by a water polo player in a single Olympic tournament. Four years later, he scored 27 goals in Seoul.

The most recent player to scoring 25 or more goals in a tournament was Alessandro Calcaterra, with Italy men's national team at the 2008 Beijing Olympics.

Legend
  – Host team
 Player‡ – Player who won the tournament with his team

Sources:
 Official Reports (PDF): 1900–1972, 1976 (p. 497), 1980 (p. 510), 1984 (p. 534), 1988–1996;
 Official Results Books (PDF): 2000 (pp. 45–92), 2004 (p. 184), 2008 (p. 179), 2012 (p. 466), 2016 (p. 100);
 Olympedia: 1900–2016 (men's tournaments);
 Sports Reference: 1900–2016 (men's tournaments).

The following table is pre-sorted by edition of the Olympics (in ascending order), number of matches played (in ascending order), name of the player (in ascending order), respectively. Last updated: 1 April 2021.

Hans Schneider of Germany scored 22 goals at the 1936 Berlin Olympics, which stood as an Olympic water polo record for one Games until 1968, when the Dutch player Nico van der Voet netted 33 goals in Mexico City.

At 18 years old, Manuel Estiarte of Spain made his Olympic debut at the 1980 Moscow Olympics, where he was the youngest-ever male top goalscorer with 21 goals. He was also the top goalscorer at the 1984 Los Angeles Olympics and the 1988 Seoul Olympics, with 34 and 27 goals, respectively. He was the joint top goalscorer at the 1992 Barcelona Olympics with 22 goals.

Hungarian left-handed player Tibor Benedek was the joint top goalscorer at the 1992 Games with 22 goals, and the top goalscorer at the 1996 Atlanta Olympics with 19 goals.

Aleksandar Šapić, representing FR Yugoslavia, was the top goalscorer at the 2000 Sydney Olympics with 18 goals. Four years later, he netted 18 goals for Serbia and Montenegro, becoming the top goalscorer at the 2004 Athens Olympics.

31-year-old István Szívós Sr. scored 16 goals for Hungary at the 1952 Helsinki Olympics, which stood as an age record for the oldest top goalscorer in a single Olympic water polo tournament until 2008, when 33-year-old Alessandro Calcaterra of Italy netted 27 goals in Beijing.

Left-hander Filip Filipović of Serbia was the joint top goalscorer at the 2016 Olympics, with 19 goals. He netted two goals in the gold medal match, helping the Serbian team win the Olympics.

Legend
  – Host team
 Player‡ – Player who won the tournament with his team

Sources:
 Official Reports (PDF): 1900–1972, 1976 (p. 497), 1980 (p. 510), 1984 (p. 534), 1988–1996;
 Official Results Books (PDF): 2000 (pp. 45–92), 2004 (p. 184), 2008 (p. 179), 2012 (p. 466), 2016 (p. 100);
 Olympedia: 1900–2016 (men's tournaments);
 Sports Reference: 1900–2016 (men's tournaments).

The following table shows the historical progression of the record of goals scored by a male water polo player in a single Olympic tournament. Last updated: 1 April 2021.

Legend
  – Host team
 Player‡ – Player who won the tournament with his team

Top goalscorers (all-time)

The following table is pre-sorted by number of total goals (in descending order), number of total Olympic matches played (in ascending order), date of the last Olympic match played (in ascending order), date of the first Olympic match played (in ascending order), name of the player (in ascending order), respectively. Last updated: 1 April 2021.

Six-time Olympian Manuel Estiarte holds the record for the most goals scored by a water polo player in Olympic history, with 127 goals, far more than any other player. At his first three Olympics (1980–1988), Estiarte netted 82 goals.

Hungarian left-hander Tibor Benedek scored 65 goals at five Olympics (1992–2008), and his teammate Tamás Kásás netted 56 goals between 1996 and 2012.

Aleksandar Šapić, representing FR Yugoslavia in 1996 and 2000, Serbia and Montenegro in 2004, and Serbia in 2008, scored 64 goals in 32 matches.

Tony Azevedo of the United States holds the record for the most goals scored by a non-European water polo player in Olympic history, with 61 goals at five Olympics (2000–2016).

Gianni De Magistris is the top scorer for the Italy men's Olympic water polo team, with 59 goals (1968–1984). His compatriot Eraldo Pizzo netted 53 goals at four Olympics between 1960 and 1972.

Charles Turner, representing Australia between 1976 and 1984, scored 50 goals in 23 matches.

Legend
  – Hosts

Sources:
 Official Reports (PDF): 1900–1972, 1976 (p. 497), 1980 (p. 510), 1984 (p. 534), 1988–1996;
 Official Results Books (PDF): 2000 (pp. 45–92), 2004 (p. 184), 2008 (p. 179), 2012 (p. 466), 2016 (p. 100);
 Olympedia: 1900–2016 (men's tournaments);
 Sports Reference: 1900–2016 (men's tournaments).

The following table shows the historical progression of the record of total goals scored by a male water polo player at the Summer Olympics. Last updated: 1 April 2021.

Legend
  – Host team
 Player‡ – Player who won the tournament with his team

Top goalkeepers (one match)

The following table is pre-sorted by date of the match (in ascending order), name of the goalkeeper (in ascending order), respectively. Last updated: 1 April 2021.

Since 1996, nine male water polo goalkeepers have each saved sixteen or more shots in an Olympic match.

The first man to do so was Christopher Duplanty, with the United States men's national team in Atlanta. He blocked 20 shots on 24 July 1996, setting the record for the most shots saved by a water polo goalkeeper in a single Olympic match.

The most recent goalkeeper to do so was Viktor Nagy, with Hungary men's national team in Rio de Janeiro on 18 August 2016.

Italian Stefano Tempesti is the only water polo goalkeeper to achieve this feat twice.

Legend and abbreviation

  – Player's team drew the match
  – Player's team lost the match
  – Host team
 Player‡ – Player who won the tournament with his team
 aet – After extra time
 pso – Penalty shootout
 OR – Official Reports
 ORB – Official Results Books

The following table shows the historical progression of the record of shots saved by a male water polo goalkeeper in a single Olympic match since 1996. Last updated: 1 April 2021.

Legend
  – Host team
 Player‡ – Player who won the tournament with his team
 OR – Official Reports
 ORB – Official Results Books

Top goalkeepers (one tournament)

The following table is pre-sorted by number of saves (in descending order), edition of the Olympics (in ascending order), number of matches played (in ascending order), name of the goalkeeper (in ascending order), respectively. Last updated: 1 April 2021.

Since 1996, six male goalkeepers have saved 75 or more shots in an Olympic water polo tournament.

Stefano Tempesti of Italy is the first water polo goalkeeper to achieve this feat twice. At the 2008 Olympics, Tempesti saved 83 shots. Four years later in London, he blocked 87 shots, setting the record for the most saves by a water polo goalkeeper in a single Olympic tournament.

Slobodan Soro is the second goalkeeper to achieve this feat twice. At the 2012 London Olympics, Soro saved 75 shots for Serbia. In Rio de Janeiro, he saved 81 shots for Brazil.

At the 2012 Summer Games, Josip Pavić saved 85 shots, including nine in the gold medal match, helping the Croatia team win the Olympics. He is the most efficient one among these six goalkeepers.

Legend and abbreviation
  – Host team
 Player‡ – Player who won the tournament with his team
 MP – Matches played
 Eff % – Save efficiency (Saves / Shots)
  – Highest save efficiency

Sources:
 Official Reports (PDF): 1996 (pp. 56–73);
 Official Results Books (PDF): 2000 (pp. 45–92), 2004 (p. 180), 2008 (p. 175), 2012 (p. 462), 2016 (p. 102).

The following table is pre-sorted by edition of the Olympics (in ascending order), number of matches played (in ascending order), name of the goalkeeper (in ascending order), respectively. Last updated: 1 April 2021.

At the 2004 Summer Games, Nikolay Maksimov saved 62 shots, including seven in the bronze medal match, helping Russia win the match.

Stefano Tempesti of Italy blocked 83 shots at the 2008 Olympics. In the 2012 edition, he saved 87 shots, helping the Italian team win the Olympic silver medal.

Slobodan Soro, representing Brazil, saved 81 shots at the 2016 Rio Olympics.

Legend and abbreviation
  – Host team
 Player‡ – Player who won the tournament with his team
 MP – Matches played
 Eff % – Save efficiency (Saves / Shots)

Sources:
 Official Reports (PDF): 1996 (pp. 56–73);
 Official Results Books (PDF): 2000 (pp. 45–92), 2004 (p. 180), 2008 (p. 175), 2012 (p. 462), 2016 (p. 102).

The following table shows the historical progression of the record of shots saved by a male water polo goalkeeper in a single Olympic tournament since 1996. Last updated: 1 April 2021.

Legend
  – Host team
 Player‡ – Player who won the tournament with his team

Top goalkeepers (all-time)

The following table is pre-sorted by number of total saves (in descending order), number of total Olympic matches played (in ascending order), date of the last Olympic match played (in ascending order), date of the first Olympic match played (in ascending order), name of the goalkeeper (in ascending order), respectively. Last updated: 1 April 2021.

Five-time Olympian Stefano Tempesti holds the record for the most shots saved by a water polo goalkeeper at the Olympics since 1996, with 295 saves.

Nikolay Maksimov, representing Russia, saved 178 shots at three Olympics (1996–2004). Eight years later, he represented Kazakhstan at the 2012 London Olympics, blocking 50 shots.

Slobodan Soro saved 132 shots in 2008 and 2012, representing Serbia. He was a member of the Brazil men's national team that competed at the 2016 Rio Olympics, blocking 81 shots.

Legend
  – Hosts

Sources:
 Official Reports (PDF): 1996 (pp. 56–73);
 Official Results Books (PDF): 2000 (pp. 45–92), 2004 (p. 180), 2008 (p. 175), 2012 (p. 462), 2016 (p. 102).

The following table shows the historical progression of the record of total shots saved by a male water polo goalkeeper at the Summer Olympics since 1996. Last updated: 1 April 2021.

Legend
  – Host team
 Player‡ – Player who won the tournament with his team

Top sprinters (one tournament)

The following table is pre-sorted by number of sprints won (in descending order), edition of the Olympics (in ascending order), number of sprints contested (in ascending order), name of the player (in ascending order), respectively. Last updated: 15 May 2021.

Sprinters are usually the fastest swimmers of the water polo team. If a water polo player won an Olympic medal in swimming, he would be an outstanding sprinter.

Brad Schumacher is the latest example. He won two gold medals for the United States at the 1996 Atlanta Olympics: in the men's 4×100 meter freestyle relay and men's 4×200 meter freestyle relay. At the 2000 Sydney Olympics, he was the top sprinter of the men's water polo tournament, with 20 sprints won.

Since 2000, three male players have won 20 or more sprints in an Olympic water polo tournament.

Pietro Figlioli is the first and only water polo player to achieve this feat twice. At the 2004 Summer Olympics, Figlioli won 24 sprints for Australia, setting the record for the most sprints won by a water polo player in a single Olympic tournament. Four years later, he won 21 sprints in Beijing.

At the 2004 Athens Olympics, Sergey Garbuzov won 20 sprints, helping Russia win bronze. He is the most efficient one among these three sprinters.

Legend and abbreviation
  – Host team
 Player‡ – Player who won the tournament with his team
 Eff % – Efficiency (Sprints won / Sprints contested)
  – Highest efficiency

Source:
 Official Results Books (PDF): 2000 (p. 44), 2004 (p. 183), 2008 (p. 178), 2012 (p. 465), 2016 (p. 99).

The following table is pre-sorted by edition of the Olympics (in ascending order), number of sprints contested (in ascending order), name of the player (in ascending order), respectively. Last updated: 15 May 2021.

At the 2000 Olympics, Brad Schumacher won 20 sprints for the United States, becoming the top sprinter of the tournament.

Pietro Figlioli was the top sprinter in 2004 and 2008, representing Australia. He was a member of the Italy men's national team that competed at the 2012 London Olympics. He was the joint top sprinter in 2012.

Rhys Howden of Australia was another joint top sprinter in 2012. He was also the top sprinter at the 2016 Rio Olympics.

Legend and abbreviation
  – Host team
 Player‡ – Player who won the tournament with his team
 Eff % – Efficiency (Sprints won / Sprints contested)

Source:
 Official Results Books (PDF): 2000 (p. 44), 2004 (p. 183), 2008 (p. 178), 2012 (p. 465), 2016 (p. 99).

The following table shows the historical progression of the record of sprints won by a male water polo player in a single Olympic tournament since 2000. Last updated: 15 May 2021.

Legend
  – Host team
 Player‡ – Player who won the tournament with his team

Top sprinters (all-time)
The following table is pre-sorted by number of total sprints won (in descending order), number of total sprints contested (in ascending order), year of the last Olympic appearance (in ascending order), year of the first Olympic appearance (in ascending order), name of the player (in ascending order), respectively. Last updated: 15 May 2021.

Pietro Figlioli holds the record for the most sprints won by a water polo player at the Olympics since 2000, with 78 sprints won at four Olympics (2004–2016).

Australian Rhys Howden won 42 sprints in three Olympic tournaments between 2008 and 2016.

Aleksandar Ćirić, representing FR Yugoslavia in 2000, Serbia and Montenegro in 2004, and Serbia in 2008, won 40 sprints at three Olympics.

Legend and abbreviation
  – Hosts
 Eff % – Efficiency (Sprints won / Sprints contested)

Source:
 Official Results Books (PDF): 2000 (p. 44), 2004 (p. 183), 2008 (p. 178), 2012 (p. 465), 2016 (p. 99).

The following table shows the historical progression of the record of total sprints won by a male water polo player at the Summer Olympics since 2000. Last updated: 15 May 2021.

Legend
  – Host team
 Player‡ – Player who won the tournament with his team

All-star teams by tournament

This is a summary of men's Olympic all-star teams by tournament. Last updated: 1 April 2021.

Legend and abbreviation
 Player‡ – Player who won the tournament with his team
 LH – Left-handed
 Eff % – Save efficiency (Saves / Shots)

Olympic and world champions (players)

Olympic champion families

Coach statistics

Most successful coaches

The following table is pre-sorted by total number of Olympic medals (in descending order), number of Olympic gold medals (in descending order), number of Olympic silver medals (in descending order), year of winning the last Olympic medal (in ascending order), year of winning the first Olympic medal (in ascending order), name of the coach (in ascending order), respectively. Last updated: 31 March 2021.

There are four coaches who led men's national water polo teams to win three or more Olympic medals.

Ratko Rudić is the most successful water polo coach in Olympic history. As a head coach, he led three men's national water polo teams to win four Olympic gold medals and one Olympic bronze medal. He guided Yugoslavia men's national team to two consecutive gold medals in 1984 and 1988, Italy men's national team to a gold medal in 1992 and a bronze medal in 1996, and Croatia men's national team to a gold medal in 2012, making him the first and only coach to lead three different men's national water polo teams to the Olympic titles.

Dénes Kemény of Hungary is another coach who led men's national water polo team(s) to win three Olympic gold medals. Under his leadership, the Hungary men's national team won three gold in a row between 2000 and 2008, becoming the second water polo team to have an Olympic winning streak.

Dezső Gyarmati coached the Hungary men's national team to three consecutive Olympic medals, a silver in 1972, a gold in 1976, and a bronze in 1980.

Boris Popov led the Soviet Union men's national team to win an Olympic gold medal in 1980 and a bronze medal in 1988. Four years later, he coached the Unified Team to another bronze medal.

Legend
  – Hosts

Medals as coach and player

The following table is pre-sorted by total number of Olympic medals (in descending order), number of Olympic gold medals (in descending order), number of Olympic silver medals (in descending order), year of winning the last Olympic medal (in ascending order), year of winning the first Olympic medal (in ascending order), name of the person (in ascending order), respectively. Last updated: 7 May 2021.

Twelve water polo players won Olympic medals and then guided men's national water polo teams to the Olympic podium as head coaches.

Dezső Gyarmati of Hungary won five Olympic medals in a row between 1948 and 1964. He coached the Hungary men's national team to three consecutive Olympic medals, including a gold in 1976, making him the only man to win Olympic gold in water polo as player and head coach in the last 100 years.

Ivo Trumbić won the silver medal in 1964 and Yugoslavia's first Olympic gold medal in water polo in 1968. He moved to the Netherlands in 1973, hired as the head coach of the Netherlands men's national team. At the 1976 Olympics in Montreal, he led the Dutch team to win a bronze medal.

Vladimir Semyonov, representing the Soviet Union, won three Olympic medals in a row between 1960 and 1968. As a head coach, he led the Soviet Union men's national water polo team to win an Olympic gold medal in 1972.

Soviet Boris Popov won a bronze medal at the Tokyo Olympics in 1964. He guided the Soviet Union men's national team to two Olympic medals in 1980 and 1988, and the Unified Team to a bronze medal in 1992.

Aleksandr Kabanov of the Soviet Union won a gold at the Munich Olympics in 1972, coached by Vladimir Semyonov. Eight years later, he won the second gold medal at the Moscow Olympics in 1980, coached by Boris Popov. As a head coach, he led Russia men's national team to win two consecutive medals in 2000 and 2004.

Ratko Rudić won a silver medal for Yugoslavia at the Moscow Olympics in 1980. Upon retirement as an athlete, he immediately entered the coaching ranks. During his career, Rudić guided three different men's national teams to five Olympic medals, more than any other coaches.

Terry Schroeder of the United States won two consecutive silver medals at the 1984 and 1988 Olympics. Twenty years later, he coached the United States men's national team to a silver in 2008, becoming the first and only non-European to achieve this feat.

Italian Alessandro Campagna won a gold medal at the Barcelona Olympics in 1992, coached by Ratko Rudić. As a head coach, he led Italy men's national team to win two medals in 2012 and 2016.

Dejan Savić won three consecutive Olympic medals between 2000 and 2008. At the 2016 Summer Games in Rio de Janeiro, he coached Serbia men's national team to the Olympic title.

Legend
 Year* – As host team

Olympic and world champions (coaches)

See also
 Water polo at the Summer Olympics

 Lists of Olympic water polo records and statistics
 List of women's Olympic water polo tournament records and statistics
 List of Olympic champions in men's water polo
 List of Olympic champions in women's water polo
 National team appearances in the men's Olympic water polo tournament
 National team appearances in the women's Olympic water polo tournament
 List of players who have appeared in multiple men's Olympic water polo tournaments
 List of players who have appeared in multiple women's Olympic water polo tournaments
 List of Olympic medalists in water polo (men)
 List of Olympic medalists in water polo (women)
 List of men's Olympic water polo tournament top goalscorers
 List of women's Olympic water polo tournament top goalscorers
 List of men's Olympic water polo tournament goalkeepers
 List of women's Olympic water polo tournament goalkeepers
 List of Olympic venues in water polo

 FINA Water Polo World Rankings
 List of water polo world medalists
 Major achievements in water polo by nation

Notes

References

Sources

Official Reports (IOC)
PDF documents in the LA84 Foundation Digital Library:

 Official Report of the 1896 Olympic Games (download, archive)
 Official Report of the 1900 Olympic Games (download, archive)
 Official Report of the 1904 Olympic Games (download, archive)
 Official Report of the 1908 Olympic Games (download, archive) (pp. 359–361)
 Official Report of the 1912 Olympic Games (download, archive) (pp. 1021–1024, 1031–1037)
 Official Report of the 1920 Olympic Games (download, archive) (p. 130)
 Official Report of the 1924 Olympic Games (download, archive) (pp. 439–440, 486–494)
 Official Report of the 1928 Olympic Games (download, archive) (pp. 746–757, 797–807)
 Official Report of the 1932 Olympic Games (download, archive) (pp. 619–623, 646–652)
 Official Report of the 1936 Olympic Games, v.2 (download, archive) (pp. 345–356)
 Official Report of the 1948 Olympic Games (download, archive) (pp. 537–540, 640–647)
 Official Report of the 1952 Olympic Games (download, archive) (pp. 600–608)
 Official Report of the 1956 Olympic Games (download, archive) (pp. 592–594, 624–627)
 Official Report of the 1960 Olympic Games (download, archive) (pp. 552–555, 617–634)
 Official Report of the 1964 Olympic Games, v.2 (download, archive) (pp. 682–698)
 Official Report of the 1968 Olympic Games, v.3 (download, archive) (pp. 449–466, 811–826)
 Official Report of the 1972 Olympic Games, v.3 (download, archive) (pp. 331, 353–365)
 Official Report of the 1976 Olympic Games, v.3 (download, archive) (pp. 446–447, 484–497)
 Official Report of the 1980 Olympic Games, v.3 (download, archive) (pp. 458, 495–510)
 Official Report of the 1984 Olympic Games, v.2 (download, archive) (pp. 528–534)
 Official Report of the 1988 Olympic Games, v.2 (download, archive) (pp. 590–598)
 Official Report of the 1992 Olympic Games, v.5 (download, archive) (pp. 354, 386–400)
 Official Report of the 1996 Olympic Games, v.3 (download, archive) (pp. 56–73)

Official Results Books (IOC)
PDF documents in the LA84 Foundation Digital Library:
 Official Results Book – 2000 Olympic Games – Water Polo (download, archive)
 Official Results Book – 2004 Olympic Games – Water Polo (download, archive)
 Official Results Book – 2008 Olympic Games – Water Polo (download, archive)

PDF documents on the FINA website:
 Official Results Book – 2012 Olympic Games – Diving, Swimming, Synchronised Swimming, Water Polo (archive) (pp. 284–507)

PDF documents in the Olympic World Library:
 Official Results Book – 2016 Olympic Games – Water Polo (archive)

PDF documents on the International Olympic Committee website:
 Official Results Book – 2020 Olympic Games – Water Polo (archive)

Official Reports (FINA)
PDF documents on the FINA website:
 HistoFINA – Water polo medalists and statistics (as of September 2019) (archive) (pp. 4–13)
 1870–2020 | 150 years of Water Polo – Evolution of its rules (archive)

Official website (IOC)
Water polo on the International Olympic Committee website:
 Water polo
 Men's water polo

Olympedia
Water polo on the Olympedia website:

 Water polo
 Men's water polo
 Athlete count for water polo
 Water polo venues
 Water polo at the 1900 Summer Olympics (men's tournament)
 Water polo at the 1904 Summer Olympics (men's tournament)
 Water polo at the 1908 Summer Olympics (men's tournament)
 Water polo at the 1912 Summer Olympics (men's tournament)
 Water polo at the 1920 Summer Olympics (men's tournament)
 Water polo at the 1924 Summer Olympics (men's tournament)
 Water polo at the 1928 Summer Olympics (men's tournament)
 Water polo at the 1932 Summer Olympics (men's tournament)
 Water polo at the 1936 Summer Olympics (men's tournament)
 Water polo at the 1948 Summer Olympics (men's tournament)
 Water polo at the 1952 Summer Olympics (men's tournament)
 Water polo at the 1956 Summer Olympics (men's tournament)
 Water polo at the 1960 Summer Olympics (men's tournament)
 Water polo at the 1964 Summer Olympics (men's tournament)
 Water polo at the 1968 Summer Olympics (men's tournament)
 Water polo at the 1972 Summer Olympics (men's tournament)
 Water polo at the 1976 Summer Olympics (men's tournament)
 Water polo at the 1980 Summer Olympics (men's tournament)
 Water polo at the 1984 Summer Olympics (men's tournament)
 Water polo at the 1988 Summer Olympics (men's tournament)
 Water polo at the 1992 Summer Olympics (men's tournament)
 Water polo at the 1996 Summer Olympics (men's tournament)
 Water polo at the 2000 Summer Olympics (men's tournament)
 Water polo at the 2004 Summer Olympics (men's tournament)
 Water polo at the 2008 Summer Olympics (men's tournament)
 Water polo at the 2012 Summer Olympics (men's tournament)
 Water polo at the 2016 Summer Olympics (men's tournament)
 Water polo at the 2020 Summer Olympics (men's tournament)

Sports Reference
Water polo on the Sports Reference website:

 Country Medal Leaders & Athlete Medal Leaders (1900–2016) (archived)
 Men's water polo (1900–2016) (archived)
 Water polo at the 1900 Summer Games (men's tournament) (archived)
 Water polo at the 1904 Summer Games (men's tournament) (archived)
 Water polo at the 1908 Summer Games (men's tournament) (archived)
 Water polo at the 1912 Summer Games (men's tournament) (archived)
 Water polo at the 1920 Summer Games (men's tournament) (archived)
 Water polo at the 1924 Summer Games (men's tournament) (archived)
 Water polo at the 1928 Summer Games (men's tournament) (archived)
 Water polo at the 1932 Summer Games (men's tournament) (archived)
 Water polo at the 1936 Summer Games (men's tournament) (archived)
 Water polo at the 1948 Summer Games (men's tournament) (archived)
 Water polo at the 1952 Summer Games (men's tournament) (archived)
 Water polo at the 1956 Summer Games (men's tournament) (archived)
 Water polo at the 1960 Summer Games (men's tournament) (archived)
 Water polo at the 1964 Summer Games (men's tournament) (archived)
 Water polo at the 1968 Summer Games (men's tournament) (archived)
 Water polo at the 1972 Summer Games (men's tournament) (archived)
 Water polo at the 1976 Summer Games (men's tournament) (archived)
 Water polo at the 1980 Summer Games (men's tournament) (archived)
 Water polo at the 1984 Summer Games (men's tournament) (archived)
 Water polo at the 1988 Summer Games (men's tournament) (archived)
 Water polo at the 1992 Summer Games (men's tournament) (archived)
 Water polo at the 1996 Summer Games (men's tournament) (archived)
 Water polo at the 2000 Summer Games (men's tournament) (archived)
 Water polo at the 2004 Summer Games (men's tournament) (archived)
 Water polo at the 2008 Summer Games (men's tournament) (archived)
 Water polo at the 2012 Summer Games (men's tournament) (archived)
 Water polo at the 2016 Summer Games (men's tournament) (archived)

Todor66
Water polo on the Todor66 website:

 Water polo at the Summer Games
 Water polo at the 1900 Summer Olympics (men's tournament)
 Water polo at the 1904 Summer Olympics (men's tournament)
 Water polo at the 1908 Summer Olympics (men's tournament)
 Water polo at the 1912 Summer Olympics (men's tournament)
 Water polo at the 1920 Summer Olympics (men's tournament)
 Water polo at the 1924 Summer Olympics (men's tournament)
 Water polo at the 1928 Summer Olympics (men's tournament)
 Water polo at the 1932 Summer Olympics (men's tournament)
 Water polo at the 1936 Summer Olympics (men's tournament)
 Water polo at the 1948 Summer Olympics (men's tournament)
 Water polo at the 1952 Summer Olympics (men's tournament)
 Water polo at the 1956 Summer Olympics (men's tournament)
 Water polo at the 1960 Summer Olympics (men's tournament)
 Water polo at the 1964 Summer Olympics (men's tournament)
 Water polo at the 1968 Summer Olympics (men's tournament, men's qualification)
 Water polo at the 1972 Summer Olympics (men's tournament, men's qualification)
 Water polo at the 1976 Summer Olympics (men's tournament, men's European qualification)
 Water polo at the 1980 Summer Olympics (men's tournament, men's European qualification, men's world qualification)
 Water polo at the 1984 Summer Olympics (men's tournament, men's qualification)
 Water polo at the 1988 Summer Olympics (men's tournament, men's qualification)
 Water polo at the 1992 Summer Olympics (men's tournament, men's qualification)
 Water polo at the 1996 Summer Olympics (men's tournament, men's qualification)
 Water polo at the 2000 Summer Olympics (men's tournament, men's qualification)
 Water polo at the 2004 Summer Olympics (men's tournament, men's qualification)
 Water polo at the 2008 Summer Olympics (men's tournament, men's qualification)
 Water polo at the 2012 Summer Olympics (men's tournament, men's qualification)
 Water polo at the 2016 Summer Olympics (men's tournament, men's qualification)
 Water polo at the 2020 Summer Olympics (men's tournament, men's qualification)

External links
 Olympic water polo – Official website

!Men
Men's Olympic water polo tournament statistics – top goalkeepers (all-time)